The Florida Panther National Wildlife Refuge is part of the United States National Wildlife Refuge System, located in southwestern Florida, twenty miles east of Naples, in the upper segment of the Fakahatchee Strand of the Big Cypress Swamp. It is north of I-75 and west of SR 29.

History
The  refuge was established in 1989 under the Endangered Species Act by the US Fish and Wildlife Service, to protect the endangered Florida panther, as well as other threatened plant and animal species. The Florida panther is the only cougar population found east of the Mississippi River. The refuge is part of a network of private land and government protected areas. Some of the public sections of the system are the Everglades National Park, Big Cypress National Preserve and Fakahatchee Strand State Preserve. In all, less than 100 panthers use the area, with fewer than a dozen passing through the refuge each month.

To protect the panther and other endangered inhabitants, general public use is only available at the southeast corner of the refuge, on designated hiking trails. All other areas can only be seen by way of limited tours.

Flora
The refuge is a mix of dry, upland habitat and wetlands, including pine rocklands and tropical hardwood hammocks. Among the rare flowering plants there are tropical orchids such as Cyrtopodium punctatum and Epidendrum nocturnum.

Fauna
Besides the panthers, the refuge is home to Big Cypress fox squirrels, bobcats, armadillos, raccoons, black bears, coyotes, alligators, swallow-tailed kites and several wood stork rookeries.

Statistics
In 2005, the refuge had an 18-person staff and a fiscal year budget of $1,500,000 (with Ten Thousand Islands National Wildlife Refuge). Approximately 8,000 visitors come to the refuge each year.

Notes

External links
 
 Florida Panther National Wildlife Refuge
 Florida Panther National Wildlife Refuge overview
 Florida Panther National Wildlife Refuge at Defenders of Wildlife
 Friends of the Florida Panther Refuge

Protected areas of Collier County, Florida
National Wildlife Refuges in Florida
Protected areas established in 1989
Wetlands of Florida
Landforms of Collier County, Florida
1989 establishments in Florida